Arturo García Muñoz (born 17 March 1981), known as Arzu, is a Spanish former professional footballer who played as a defensive midfielder or a centre-back.

He spent most of his professional career with Betis, appearing in 200 La Liga games over the course of seven seasons (12 years with the club overall, 317 official matches) and winning one Copa del Rey.

Club career

Betis
A product of Andalusian club Real Betis's youth system, Arzu was born in Dos Hermanas, Seville, and he played for its B-team during the 1999–2000 season, scoring twice in 19 league games. In the following campaign, he made his debuts with the main squad who was playing in the second division – 16 matches, two goals – helping achieve promotion but subsequently staying in the category, being loaned to neighbours Córdoba CF.

In his first season in La Liga, Arzu netted four times from 35 appearances, including one in the opener away to Deportivo de La Coruña on 1 September 2002 (4–2 win). He added a further 60 league games in the following two years combined, as in 2004–05 Betis finished fourth.

During the 2005–06 campaign, Arzu appeared in eight European matches: four in the UEFA Champions League (scoring against Liverpool in a 2–1 group stage home loss) and in the UEFA Cup. On 13 May 2006, he netted a crucial equalizer in a 1–1 draw at Atlético Madrid on the last matchday, with the Verdiblancos barely avoiding relegation.

Still a defensive cornerstone in 2008–09, Arzu featured in 34 contests – mostly as a centre back – but Betis was relegated for the first time in nine years. In August 2011, after only taking part in 17 games as the side returned to the top level, he was released from his contract.

Later years
In the penultimate day of the 2011 summer transfer window, Arzu signed with Gimnàstic de Tarragona in the second level. On 7 May of the following year, he terminated his contract with the Catalans (who suffered relegation) by mutual consent.

In August 2012, aged 31, Arzu moved abroad for the first time, joining Thai Premier League club BEC Tero Sasana FC.

References

External links

1981 births
Living people
Spanish footballers
Footballers from Dos Hermanas
Association football defenders
Association football midfielders
Association football utility players
La Liga players
Segunda División players
Segunda División B players
Tercera División players
Betis Deportivo Balompié footballers
Real Betis players
Córdoba CF players
Gimnàstic de Tarragona footballers
Thai League 1 players
Police Tero F.C. players
Spain youth international footballers
Spain under-21 international footballers
Spanish expatriate footballers
Expatriate footballers in Thailand
Spanish expatriate sportspeople in Thailand
Spanish Romani people